Kortine is a small dispersed settlement near Rižana in the City Municipality of Koper in the Littoral region of Slovenia.

References

External links
Kortine on Geopedia

Populated places in the City Municipality of Koper